Boyd & Parker Park and Groveland Ambuscade is a historic park area located near the Town of Groveland in Livingston County, New York. The site commemorates the Boyd and Parker ambush, which took place during the Sullivan Expedition of the American Revolutionary War of September 1779.

These sites were listed on the National Register of Historic Places in 2009.

References

External links
 History of the site

Parks in Livingston County, New York
National Register of Historic Places in Livingston County, New York
Parks on the National Register of Historic Places in New York (state)
Conflict sites on the National Register of Historic Places in New York (state)
American Revolution on the National Register of Historic Places